The 2011 Louisiana–Monroe Warhawks team represented the University of Louisiana at Monroe in the 2011 NCAA Division I FBS football season. The Warhawks were led by second-year head coach Todd Berry and played their home games at Malone Stadium. They are members of the Sun Belt Conference. They finished the season 4–8, 3–5 in Sun Belt play to finish in sixth place.

Schedule

References

Louisiana-Monroe
Louisiana–Monroe Warhawks football seasons
Louisiana-Monroe Warhawks football